Alison Phillips (born 1970) is a British journalist and the Editor of the Daily Mirror since 2018.

Biography  
Phillips grew up in Essex and first worked as a reporter for the Harlow Star Weekly Newspaper. She then attended the University of Leeds where she took a secondment for a year as the editor of the student newspaper (Leeds Student, now called the Gryphon). She then worked for the Evening Argus in Brighton, Connors News Agency and Woman before joining Trinity Mirror (now Reach) in 1998 as a feature writer on the Sunday People magazine.

In 2016, Phillips launched The New Day, a national newspaper which aimed to deliver politically neutral news, primarily for a female audience. Its launch was sceptically received by media commentators. The new venture failed to reach target circulation and was closed two months after its launch. Later that year she was made Deputy Editor-in-Chief of the Trinity Mirror papers.

In 2018, Phillips was named as the Editor of the Daily Mirror, making her its first female editor since its very first editor in 1903, Mary Howarth. She often writes and speaks about gender equality and the gender pay gap, including at her own company.

She is a regular media commentator, often appearing on programmes such as the BBC's Politics Live and ITV's This Morning. In June 2018. she was a guest on BBC One's Question Time, declaring that the Brexit negotiations had made Britain "a global laughing stock".

In 2018 she was named a "Columnist of the Year" at the National Press Awards, for her weekly Wednesday column in the Daily Mirror. The column often covers working-class family issues from a broadly left-wing perspective. Under her editorship, the Daily Mirrors stance on Brexit has been critical of the Conservative government, but remained opposed to calls for a second referendum. Phillips succeeded Eleanor Mills as chair of the Women in Journalism pressure group in February 2021.

References

1970 births
Living people
People from Essex
21st-century British journalists
British women journalists
British newspaper editors